Zonuzaq (also Romanized as Zonūzaq; also known as Zonūzākh, and Zunuzakh) is a village in Zonuzaq Rural District of the Central District of Marand County, East Azerbaijan province, Iran. At the 2006 National Census, its population was 1,567 in 397 households. The following census in 2011 counted 1,287 people in 406 households. The latest census in 2016 showed a population of 1,052 people in 354 households; it was the largest village in its rural district. Zonuzaq is famous for the stepwise architecture of its houses.

References 

Marand County

Populated places in East Azerbaijan Province

Populated places in Marand County